Obaidul Quader (born 1 January 1952) is a Bangladeshi politician who has been General Secretary of Bangladesh Awami League since October 2016. He has served as the Minister of Road Transport and Bridges since December 2011 and as a Member of Parliament representing the Noakhali-5 constituency since January 2009. He is also  Media Adviser for the Bangladesh Awami League and regularly conducts press conferences on their behalf. He was the State Minister for Youth and Sports from 1996 to 2001.

Early life and education
Obaidul Quader was born on 1 January 1952 to Mosharrof Hussain and Begum Fazilatunnesa (d. 2018) in Bara Rajapur village, in what is now Companiganj Upazila, Noakhali. He has six sisters and three brothers including Abdul Kader Mirza, the incumbent mayor of Basurhat municipality in Companiganj, Noakhali. He completed his matriculation with a first division from Basurhat A. H. C. Government High School and HSC from Noakhali Government College. He obtained a bachelor's degree in political science from the University of Dhaka.

Career

Quader was involved in politics since his college life. In 1966, he played an active role during the six point movement. He was also active in the mass uprising and the eleven-point movement in 1969. He joined the Liberation War of Bangladesh as the commander of Companigonj Thana Mujib Forces. After 1975, Qader was imprisoned for two and a half years. While in prison, he was elected president of the central committee of the Bangladesh Chhatra League and he remained so for two consecutive terms. He worked as the assistant editor of the newspaper in Daily Banglar Bani for a long time.

Quader was elected as a member of parliament for the constituency Noakhali-5 in the parliamentary elections of 12 June 1996. He was State Minister of Youth, Sports, and Cultural Affairs from 23 June 1996 to 15 July 2001, and he was first senior joint general secretary of the Bangladesh Awami League from 26 December 2002 to 26 July 2009. He was arrested on 9 March 2007 by the Caretaker government of Bangladesh and remained in prison for 17 months and 26 days before he was released on bail on 5 September 2008.

On 5 December 2011, Quader was appointed as Minister of Communication. He was elected as a member of parliament on 5 January 2014, for the constituency Noakhali-5 for the third time in the 10th parliamentary election. He became the general secretary of the Awami League in October 2016 at the 20th council of the party. Quader retained the general secretary post in the Awami League’s 22nd national council for a 3rd consecutive term.

Corruption allegation
Obaidul Quader was arrested by the joint forces on corruption allegation on 9 March 2007, and corruption charges were framed against him and his wife for accumulating wealth illegally and concealing them in income file records. He was also accused of providing fake sources of income by the Anti-Corruption Commission of Bangladesh.

In 2019, Netra News revealed that Obaidul Quader has a collection of dozens of expensive wristwatches that cost tens of thousands of USD. Wristwatches in his possession include brands like Rolex, Ulysse Nardin and Louis Vuitton. According to the whistleblower, Obaidul receives watches from contractors of the megaprojects in lieu of undue favours. Obaidul Quader later accepted of owning the expensive wristwatches cited in the report to the media and claimed that the watches were gifted to him by Awami League supporters and leaders. 
However, the claim of receiving expensive gifts suggests Obaidul Quader has violated the Toshakhana (Maintenance and Administrative) Rules 1974. Section 4(b) of the rules mentions that the ministers can only accept gifts up to 30,000 Bangladeshi takas (equivalent to USD 300) without handing them over the treasury of the government. Transparency International Bangladesh chapter raised question on his acquiring of expensive wristwatches.

Works
Quader authored the following books:
 Bangladesh: A Revolution Betrayed (1976)
 Bangladesher Hridoy Hote
 Pakistaner Karagare Bangabandhu
 Ei Bijoyer Mukut Kothai
 Teen Somudrer Deshe
 Meghe Meghe Onek Bela
 Rochona Somogro
 Karagare Lekha Onusmriti : Je Kotha Bola Hoyni
 Nirbachito Column
 Gangchil

Personal life
Quader married Isratunnesa Quader.

Notes

References

1950 births
Living people
University of Dhaka alumni
Awami League politicians
General Secretaries of Awami League
State Ministers of Cultural Affairs (Bangladesh)
State Ministers of Youth and Sports (Bangladesh)
Road Transport and Bridges ministers of Bangladesh
Commerce ministers of Bangladesh
11th Jatiya Sangsad members
7th Jatiya Sangsad members
9th Jatiya Sangsad members
10th Jatiya Sangsad members
People from Companiganj Upazila, Noakhali